Veronika Bayer (born 4 June 1940, Stuttgart – d. 31 January 2008) was a German actress.

Filmography
 1959: Liebe, Luft und lauter Lügen
 1959: Melodie und Rhythmus
 1959:  Twelve Girls and One Man 
 1960: Beloved Augustin
 1960: When the Heath Is in Bloom
 1963: Die Legende vom heiligen Trinker (TV film)
 1970: Triumph des Todes oder Das große Massakerspiel (TV film)
 1974: Macbeth (TV film)
 1977: Rückfälle (TV film)
 1979: 30 Liter Super (TV episode of Tatort)
 1993: Die Lok
 2002: Zwischen den Sternen
 2002: Der Narr und seine Frau heute Abend in Pancomedia (TV film)
 2005: Die letzte Saison
 2006: Die Österreichische Methode
 2007: Marie kann zaubern

External links
 

1940 births
2008 deaths
Actresses from Stuttgart
German film actresses
German television actresses
20th-century German actresses
21st-century German actresses